Ashk (also Romanized as Ashg and Eshk; also known as Kaleh Ishq, Qal‘eh Ishq, and Qal‘eh-ye ‘Eshq) is a village in Darmian Rural District, in the Central District of Darmian County, South Khorasan Province, Iran. At the 2006 census, its population was 569, in 109 families.

References 

Populated places in Darmian County